This table provides a list of scientific, public opinion polls that were conducted from the 2014 Quebec general election leading up to the 2018 Quebec general election, which took place as scheduled on October 1, 2018.

Mainstreet 
"*" = Mainstreet does not mention "Other" nor any other party than the main four, but the total of the main four is 100%, (±1% because of sum of rounding errors). It is not known whether any other parties were allowed in the answer, or whether those answers were excluded, but it is highly unlikely that less than 0.5% of those polled by Mainstreet prefer a party other than the main four. |}

Opinion polling in Canada
Quebec